Sasamoto (written: 笹本) is a Japanese surname. Notable people with the surname include:

, Japanese artist
, Japanese sport wrestler
, Japanese photographer
, Japanese writer
, Japanese voice actress

Japanese-language surnames